Chasseur is a French brand of colorful enameled cast iron cookware and trivets. It is manufactured by the Invicta S.A. foundry based in Donchery in the Champagne-Ardenne region of Northern France, which has been manufacturing cast iron products since 1924.

Chasseur cookware can be used on all stovetops including induction.

References

External links
 Invicta S.A. official website (French)
Chasseur official website (English)
Chasseur official website (French)
Chasseur official distributor in Greece

Kitchenware brands